Oker is a hamlet in Derbyshire, located in South Darley parish, with groups of houses along two sides of Oker Hill. The houses are largely older limestone properties including several farms, but with some more recent semi-detached properties too. A former Methodist chapel has been converted to a holiday let.

A prominent tree, known as Will Shore’s Tree, on top of Oker Hill is renowned as the subject of a sonnet by William Wordsworth concerning two local lads who each planted a tree there before parting for ever:

      'Tis said that to the brow of yon fair hill
      Two brother clomb; and turning face from face
      Nor one look more exchanging, grief to still
      Or feed, each planted on that lofty place
      A chosen tree. Then eager to fulfil
      Their courses, like two new-born rivers, they
      In opposite directions urged their way
      Down from the far-seen mount. No blast might kill
      Or blight that fond memorial. The trees grew
      And now entwine, their arms’ but ne’er again
      Embraced those brothers upon earth’s wide plain,
      Nor aught of mutual joy or sorrow knew
      Until their spirits mingled in the sea
      That to itself takes all – Eternity.

The parish church is St Mary the Virgin in the Cross Green area of Darley Bridge, located opposite South Darley Church of England Primary School.

References

External links
Tradition Of Oker Hill In Darley Dale, Derbyshire

Hamlets in Derbyshire
Derbyshire Dales